The Professionals is a 1966 American Western film written, produced, and directed by Richard Brooks and starring Burt Lancaster, Lee Marvin, Robert Ryan, Woody Strode, with Jack Palance, Claudia Cardinale and Ralph Bellamy in supporting roles. The script was adapted from the 1964 novel A Mule for the Marquesa by Frank O'Rourke.

The film received three Oscar nominations and an enthusiastic critical reception.

Plot
In the final years of the Mexican Revolution, American rancher J.W. Grant hires four men, who are all experts in their respective fields, to rescue his kidnapped wife, Maria, from Jesus Raza, a former revolutionary leader-turned-bandit.

Henry "Rico" Fardan is a weapons specialist, Bill Dolworth is an explosives expert, Hans Ehrengard is the horse wrangler, and Jake Sharp is a traditional Apache scout, skilled with a bow and arrow. Fardan and Dolworth, having both fought under the command of Pancho Villa, have a high regard for Raza as a soldier. But as cynical professionals, they have no qualms about killing him.

After they enter Mexico, they witness soldiers on a government train being massacred by Raza's small army. The professionals follow the captured train to the end of the line. When the bandits leave, they take the train before moving onto the camp where they observe Raza and his followers — including a female soldier, Chiquita (who once was in a relationship with Dolworth). At nightfall, Fardan infiltrates the camp but he is stopped from killing Raza in his quarters, witnessing Maria, Grant's kidnapped wife, about to willingly make love with Raza, leading Dolworth to conclude, "we've been had."

After bringing Grant's wife back to the train, a shootout starts because it has been retaken by the bandits. The professionals are forced to retreat into the mountains while being relentlessly pursued by Raza and his men. The group evade capture by using explosives to bring down the walls of a gully. Maria reveals they haven't rescued Grant's kidnapped wife but Raza's lover. Grant bought her in an arranged marriage from which she escaped at the earliest opportunity to return to her true love in Mexico.

Dolworth volunteers to stay behind to allow the other professionals to escape with Maria as Raza and his remaining men close in. In the ensuing fight Raza is wounded and captured while Dolworth is almost killed by a dying Chiquita whose gun is empty.

Grant and his own men meet the professionals (with Raza and Maria) at the US border. The wealthy rancher tells Fardan that their contract has been satisfactorily concluded. He then orders one of his men to kill the wounded Raza. But before he can fire, Dolworth shoots the guns from his hand. The other professionals step in to protect Maria and Raza. They collect the wounded Raza, put him on a carriage and, with Maria at the reins, send both back to Mexico.

Grant angrily turns to Fardan and says "You bastard!" to which he retorts: "Yes, sir, in my case an accident of birth. But you, sir, you are a self-made man." The professionals ride behind the fleeing carriage back into Mexico.

Cast

 Burt Lancaster as Bill Dolworth
 Lee Marvin as Henry "Rico" Fardan
 Claudia Cardinale as Maria Grant
 Robert Ryan as Hans Ehrengard
 Woody Strode as Jake Sharp
 Jack Palance as Jesus Raza
 Ralph Bellamy as Joe Grant
 Joe De Santis as Ortega
 Rafael Bertrand as Fierro
 Marie Gomez as Chiquita

Production

Writing

The film was adapted for the screen by its director Richard Brooks, who based the screenplay on the novel A Mule for the Marquesa by Frank O'Rourke.

Filming
The movie, which was shot in Technicolor, was filmed in Death Valley and the Coachella Valley in California, as well as Valley of Fire State Park in Nevada. The rail scenes were filmed on Kaiser Steel's Eagle Mountain Railroad.  The steam locomotive seen in the movie currently resides on the Heber Valley Railroad.

During filming, the cast and crew stayed in Las Vegas. Actor Woody Strode wrote in his memoirs that he and Marvin got into a lot of pranks, on one occasion shooting an arrow into Vegas Vic, the famous smiling cowboy neon sign outside The Pioneer Club.

Soundtrack
The musical score was composed by Maurice Jarre.

Reception

Box office
By 1976, it was estimated the film had earned $8.8 million in rentals in North America.

It was the ninth most popular movie at the French box office in 1966, after La Grande Vadrouille, Doctor Zhivago, Is Paris Burning?, A Fistful of Dollars, Lost Command, A Man and a Woman, For a Few Dollars More and The Big Restaurant.

Critical response

On Rotten Tomatoes, the film has an approval rating of 89% based on reviews from 18 critics.

Award and nominations

See also
 List of American films of 1966

References

External links
 
 
 

1966 films
1966 Western (genre) films
1960s English-language films
American Western (genre) films
Revisionist Western (genre) films
Mexican Revolution films
Films directed by Richard Brooks
Films scored by Maurice Jarre
Films about kidnapping
Films about mercenaries
Films set in the 1910s
Films set in Mexico
Films shot in California
Films shot in Nevada
Films shot in the Mojave Desert
Films based on American novels
Columbia Pictures films
1960s American films